= Moschomavro =

Variety of grape

- Grape (Vitis)
- Color of berry skin: Black
- Species: Vitis vinifera
- Origin: Greece
- Notable regions: Macedonia

Moschomavro (Greek Μοσχομαυρο) is a rare aromatic black grape found in central and NW Greece.

In 2016, there were 113 hectares of Moschomavro plnated, primarily in Macedonia.
